Piet Klocke (born December 20, 1948) is a German musician, cabaret artist, author and actor. He studied philosophy and German language, but quit his studies to dedicate himself to free music theater. He has played in various blues, punk and Neue Deutsche Welle bands.

Television and Movies

From 1980 on, Klocke has appeared in various TV productions and shows, including the thriller "In den Todeskrallen des Dr. Do" (In the death claws of Dr. Do) for ARD and a Saturday-night show called "Flitterabend", also on ARD. He has also made various appearances on RTL Samstag Nacht and 7 Tage, 7 Köpfe.

Klocke acted as Wachtmeister Dimpfelmoser in the 2006 movie "Räuber Hotzenplotz" (with Armin Rohde) and in "Das Fliegende Klassenzimmer" (The Flying Classroom) in 2003.

Life
In an interview, Klocke named the German cabaret artist Werner Finck as one of his role models.

Trademarks

Piet Klocke's trademark role is Professor Schmitt-Hindemith in his show "Musikstilarten im auslaufenden Jahrtausend" (Music styles of the Ending Millennium), where he is accompanied by saxophonist Simone Sonnenschein as Fräulein Angelika Kleinknecht. As Profession Schmitt-Hindemith, Klocke dresses eccentrically, and uses his scrubby red hair and lean figure to create an image of a helplessly nervous person, speaking in a very distracted way and leaving most of his sentences unfinished. He also often employs the Schmitt-Hindemith character in radio plays.

Discography
 HipHop für Angestellte (ein musikalischer Abschlußabend in der VHS) (1995)
 Das geht alles von Ihrer Zeit ab (1997)
 Abenteuer im Dioptrinanzug (2000)
 Puffy Egborn 2 oder Scheitern als Weg! (2006)

References

External links 
 Klockes website (German)
 

1957 births
Living people
German male television actors
German male comedians
German male film actors